Christ Bearing the Cross is a 1590-1595 painting by El Greco.

It was acquired by the painter and critic Aureliano de Beruete (1845-1912). It was then owned by the Catalan collector Santiago Espona (1888-1958)., who bequeathed it to the National Art Museum of Catalonia in 1958.

References 

Paintings by El Greco
Paintings in the collection of the Museu Nacional d'Art de Catalunya
1590s paintings
El Greco